The 1996–97 Regionalliga was the third season of the Regionalliga as the third tier of German football. The league was organised in four regional divisions, Nord, Nordost, West-Südwest and Süd.

FC Energie Cottbus, SG Wattenscheid 09, 1. FC Nürnberg and SpVgg Greuther Fürth were promoted to the 2. Bundesliga.

North

Final table

Top scorers

North-East

Final table

Top scorers

West/South-West

Final table

Top scorers

South

Final table

Top scorers

Promotion playoff 
The last promotion place was contested between the champions of the North and North-East regions.
First leg

Second leg

Energie Cottbus won 3–1 on aggregate and so were promoted to the 2. Bundesliga.

References

External links
 Regionalliga Nord 1996–97 at kicker.de 
 Regionalliga Nordost 1996–97 at kicker.de 
 Regionalliga West/Südwest 1996–97 at kicker.de 
 Regionalliga Süd 1996–97 at kicker.de 

1996-97
3
Germ